D-Mycosamine is an amino sugar found in several polyene antimycotics. Structural analogs of these agents lacking this monosaccharide component do not exhibit substantial antifungal activity.

References 

 Biosynthesis: 

Hexosamines
Deoxy sugars
Monosaccharides